Below Radar is an EP released independently by Helen Stellar in 2003. "IO (this time around)", the second track on the EP, features in the Cameron Crowe film Elizabethtown. It also appears on the soundtracks for Henry Poole is Here (2008) and Love Happens (2009). "Flutterby" appeared in episode 102 of the television show Friday Night Lights.

Track listing

References 

2003 EPs
EPs by American artists
Shoegaze EPs